The Bombardier Voyager is a family of high-speed 125 mph diesel-electric multiple units built in Belgium by Bombardier Transportation, for service on the railway network of the United Kingdom. Construction of the Voyager family took place between 2000 and 2005, consisting of three classes - the  Voyager,  Super Voyager and  Meridian. These three classes are currently operated by CrossCountry, Avanti West Coast, and East Midlands Railway (respectively).

Bombardier Voyagers are used on various intercity services throughout Great Britain, including the longest direct rail service in the United Kingdom, which is a CrossCountry service from Aberdeen to Penzance that takes over 13 hours to complete.

Variants

Class 220

The Class 220 Voyager DEMUs were built to operate Cross Country intercity services. Virgin CrossCountry received 34 four-car sets in 2000/01. All passed with the CrossCountry franchise to Arriva CrossCountry in November 2007.

Class 221

The Class 221 Super Voyager DEMUs were built as a tilting version of the Class 220. Although visually similar, they were fitted with a tilting mechanism and heavier bogies. Virgin CrossCountry received 40 five-car and four four-car sets. All passed with the CrossCountry franchise to Arriva CrossCountry in November 2007.

With the removal of West Coast Main Line services from the CrossCountry franchise in December 2007, 16 were transferred to Virgin Trains West Coast for use on InterCity West Coast services. A further five moved from CrossCountry to Virgin Trains West Coast in December 2008. CrossCountry removed the tilting equipment from its Class 221s to improve reliability and lower cost of maintenance.

On 8 December 2019, all of the West Coast sets passed to Avanti West Coast, the new operator of the West Coast Partnership franchise.

Class 222

The Class 222 Meridian DEMUs are broadly similar to the original Voyager units, but feature a number of reliability improvements and different internal layout.

The Class 222 was built in the light of experience gained with the 220 and 221 units; in particular, many more components were installed under the floor so as to increase space for passengers. Twenty-seven sets were built:
 Midland Mainline ordered 23 Meridians, to replace 17 Class 170 Turbostars and provide stock for a later cancelled London St Pancras to Leeds service. Originally configured as 16 four-car seven and nine-car sets, they were later re-formed into a combination of four, five and eight-car units. All were transferred to the new franchise holder East Midlands Trains (EMT) in November 2007. When EMT took over the franchise, it removed a car from six of its eight-car sets, to lengthen previously four-car units. The last remaining eight-car unit was reduced to five cars. All passed with the franchise to East Midlands Railway in 2019.
Hull Trains obtained four 4-car Class 222/1 Pioneers in 2005 to replace four Class 170 Turbostars. These units are slightly different internally from the 222/0 Meridian trains. Following a maintenance incident and the long-term unavailability of one unit, First Hull Trains replaced its Class 222 fleet with a fleet of Class 180 Adelantes in 2009. The Class 222s were transferred to EMT for use with the rest of the Class 222 fleet.

Bombardier Voyager variants

Future 

Avanti West Coast's Class 221 units will be replaced by the Class 805 and Class 807, while all Class 222 units will be replaced by the Class 810 in 2023.

Technical problems and criticism

The Class 220s and 221s have been criticised for being cramped as they are designed to be able to be converted to tilting operation, since when tilted they must still fit within the loading gauge.
Because there is one diesel engine per car, there is some underfloor noise when compared to the InterCity 125 sets and locomotive hauled trains that the units in this family replaced.
There is very little space to store heavy luggage or bicycles. Although CrossCountry has now removed the shops from its trains to increase capacity, the bicycle compartment can now only store three instead of the original four bicycles.
CrossCountry services formed of Classes 220 and 221 frequently have to be stopped at Exeter St Davids or Newton Abbot when waves break over the Dawlish sea wall, due to the roof mounted brake resistors.
The trains are shorter than the trains they replaced, but increased frequency meant no change in capacity.

Accidents and incidents
In 2006, a Class 222 unit had to be taken out of service due to a door opening in Northamptonshire on a London-Sheffield service, while the train was at speed.
On 26 May 2006, a passenger was murdered on board 220005 as the train pulled into Oxenholme whilst working the Glasgow to Paignton service.
About 100 passengers were evacuated from the train.
The fire was caused by a buildup of grime which was heated by the movement of the train's wheels.
All 175 passengers were evacuated.
On 26 September 2019 an electrical explosion occurred in a vestibule on Voyager unit 221132 (coach 60982).

Proposed conversion to electrical operation
In 2010 Bombardier proposed the conversion of several Voyager multiple units into hybrid electric and diesel vehicles capable of taking power from an overhead pantograph (electro-diesels EDMUs). The proposal was named Project Thor.

In October 2010 it was speculated that 21 additional pantograph vehicles would be manufactured at Derby Litchurch Lane Works, and 21 sets converted, at a cost of approximately £300million, however in 2011 the plant did not have the facilities to manufacture steel carriages, though it was expected that much of the work would take place in the UK, and provide work for the Derby plant. In December 2011 a proposal to electrify 30-35 sets for the CrossCountry franchise, referred to as "eVoyager", was considered by the Department for Transport.

References

British Rail diesel multiple units
Passenger trains running at least at 200 km/h in commercial operations
Train-related introductions in 2001